Figulus can mean:

 Figulus, also known as the Bingham-Blossom House, a historic home in Palm Beach, Florida
 Figulus (beetle), a stag beetle genus
 Gaius Marcius Figulus, Roman consul in 162 and 156 BC
 Gaius Marcius Figulus, son of the above, an unsuccessful candidate for consulship
 Gaius Marcius Figulus, Roman consul in 64 BC, unknown relation to the above
 Nigidius Figulus (98-45 BC), a savant of ancient Rome
 Furnarius figulus, the wing-banded hornero, a Brazilian bird